Abbeville Airport may refer to:

Aerodrome Abbeville serving Abbeville, France (ICAO: LFOI)
Abbeville Chris Crusta Memorial Airport in Abbeville, Louisiana, United States (FAA: 0R3)
Abbeville Municipal Airport in Abbeville, Alabama, United States (FAA: 0J0)